Manuel Trigueros Muñoz (born 17 October 1991) is a Spanish professional footballer who plays as a midfielder for Villarreal.

He has spent his entire professional career with Villarreal, making a club record of over 425 total appearances and winning the UEFA Europa League in 2021.

Career

Early career
Born in Talavera de la Reina, Toledo, Castilla-La Mancha, Trigueros began playing football for his local team Talavera CF. While playing in a nationwide tournament for his autonomous community, he was courted by several leading clubs, and chose FC Barcelona; he struggled to be picked in his only year as an under-18 in La Masia. He then moved to Real Murcia, making his senior debut with the reserves and being released in June 2010 following the main squad's relegation from the Segunda División.

Villarreal
Subsequently, Trigueros signed for Villarreal CF, being assigned to the C team. He made his official debut with Villarreal B on 4 June 2011, playing 30 minutes as a substitute for Fofo in a 2–1 away loss against Real Betis on the last day of the second-tier season. On 11 February 2012 he scored his first goal in a 3–1 defeat at CE Sabadell FC, being relatively played during the season but suffering relegation – even though the side finished in 12th position – as the first team had also dropped down a level in La Liga.

In June 2012, Trigueros was definitely promoted to the main squad. He contributed 36 games and three goals as the Yellow Submarine won instant promotion; his 15th appearance activated a clause that paid €100,000 to Murcia.

Trigueros made his maiden appearance in the top flight on 19 August 2013, coming on as a 53rd-minute substitute for Tomás Pina in 3–2 away victory over UD Almería. As a starter, he scored his first goal in the competition, his team's second in the 3–1 home defeat of CA Osasuna on 3 February 2014. That October, his contract was extended from 2017 to 2019; in November 2016, a new deal tied him to the club until 2022.

On 21 May 2017, Trigueros scored in a 3–1 win at local rivals Valencia CF on the last day of the season, securing fifth place and qualification for the UEFA Europa League. He netted his first in that continental competition on 19 October, as the team fought back for a 2–2 group stage draw with SK Slavia Prague at the Estadio de la Cerámica. On 23 December, in another derby at Mestalla, he was sent off for the first time in his career in a 1–0 victory.

Trigueros reached 300 matches for the club on 10 November 2019, in a 3–1 away loss against RCD Mallorca. In March 2021, he entered Villarreal's top three appearance makers, overtaking Marcos Senna's 363 and trailing only his contemporaries Bruno Soriano and Mario Gaspar. He played 14 times that season in their victorious Europa League campaign (54 in all competitions), scoring the opening goal of a 2–1 semi-final win over Arsenal on 29 April. 

In November 2021, Trigueros' link to the club was lengthened to 2025, with him remaining a key part of manager Unai Emery's plans. On 15 December, he made his 400th appearance for the club in a 7–1 rout of Atlético Sanluqueño CF in the second round of the Copa del Rey, trailing Bruno's overall record by just 25. He took the record on 8 September 2022 in a 4–3 UEFA Europa Conference League group victory at home to Lech Poznań.

Personal life
Both of Trigueros' parents were teachers, and he graduated in Primary Education in 2017. While some sources erroneously named his alma mater as CEU San Pablo University, it was actually the Castellón de la Plana campus of a linked establishment, CEU Cardinal Herrera University.

Trigueros' father, also named Manuel, played in the second tier for Granada CF. His cousin Pablo, a defender, was also active at that level for SD Ponferradina.

Career statistics

Club

Honours
Villarreal
UEFA Europa League: 2020–21

Individual
UEFA La Liga Team of the Season: 2016–17

References

External links

Villarreal official profile

1991 births
Living people
People from Talavera de la Reina
Sportspeople from the Province of Toledo
Spanish footballers
Footballers from Castilla–La Mancha
Association football midfielders
La Liga players
Segunda División players
Segunda División B players
Tercera División players
Real Murcia Imperial players
Villarreal CF C players
Villarreal CF B players
Villarreal CF players
UEFA Europa League winning players